The second season of MasterChef Singapore began airing on 21 February 2021 and ended on 25 April 2021 on Mediacorp Channel 5.

The winner of this season was Derek Cheong, with Leon Lim as the runner-up.

Top 12
Source for names, hometowns, and ages. Occupations and nicknames as given on air or stated in cites.

Elimination table
 

 (WINNER) This cook won the competition.
 (RUNNER-UP) This cook finished as a runner-up in the finals.
 (WIN) The cook won the individual challenge (Mystery Box Challenge, Skills Test, Pressure Test, or Elimination Test).
 (WIN) The cook was on the winning team in the Team Challenge.
 (HIGH) The cook was one of the top entries in the individual challenge but didn't win.
 (IN) The cook wasn't selected as a top or bottom entry in an individual challenge.
 (IN) The cook wasn't selected as a top or bottom entry in a team challenge.
 (IMM) The cook didn't have to compete in that round of the competition and was safe from elimination.
 (IMM) The cook was selected by Mystery Box Challenge winner and didn't have to compete in the Elimination Test.
 (PT) The cook was on the losing team in the Team Challenge, competed in the Pressure Test, and advanced.
 (NPT) The cook was on the losing team in the Team Challenge, did not compete in the Pressure Test, and advanced.
 (LOW) The cook was one of the bottom entries in an individual challenge or Pressure Test, but advanced.
 (LOW) The cook was one of the bottom entries in the Team Challenge, but advanced.
 (ELIM) The cook was eliminated from MasterChef.

Guest judges
Uncle Roger - Episode 2
Aaron Wong - Episode 4
Willin Low - Episode 9

Main guest appearances
Zander Ng and Genevieve Lee - Episode 3
Lay Kwan, Matthew and Jennifer from DBS's Zero Food Waste warriors, Ryan Clift - Episode 5
Labyrinth "LG" Han and Mandy Pan - Episode 7
Ivan Brehm - Episode 8
Ignatius Chan - Episode 9

Episodes

References

2021 Singaporean television seasons